Telepresence technology is a term used by the  National Oceanic and Atmospheric Administration (NOAA) to refer to  the combination of satellite technology  with the Internet to broadcast information, including video in real-time from cameras used on its remotely operated vehicle (ROV) on  Okeanos Explorer. Its ROV will be operating working in a deep sea environment. Data from the ROV is transmitted to a hub based on the land, which then send it to scientists and to the public.

This effort of the Okeanos Explorer has been compared to the lunar landing.

The telepresence technology used by NOAA includes the following:
 deep water mapping, to a depth of 6,000 m
 science-oriented ROV operations
 real-time  satellite transmission of data.
The Okeanos Explorer is designed as an educational tool that can be followed on Twitter.

Notes

Educational technology
Oceanography
Telepresence